Nanterre Cathedral is a Roman Catholic church located in the town of Nanterre, France.

The cathedral is the seat of the Bishop of Nanterre. Formerly Nanterre Parish Church, it became the Nanterre Cathedral after the establishment of the diocese in 1966.

External links

Location of cathedral

Roman Catholic cathedrals in France
Churches in Hauts-de-Seine